Dominique Debart (born 9 September 1950 in Saint-Louis (Sénégal) ) is a French conductor, especially a choral conductor. He led the choir of the Opéra de Lyon from 1977 to 1983. He founded in 1982 the chamber orchestra L'Ensemble de Basse-Normandie and recorded with them a wide repertory from Bach's cantata , to Steve Reich's The Desert Music.

References

External links 
 Dominique Debart www.arkivmusic.com
 Contre-Ring concertonet.com

Living people
French choral conductors
French male conductors (music)
1950 births
21st-century French conductors (music)
21st-century French male musicians
20th-century French conductors (music)
20th-century French male musicians